Wulituo Subdistrict is a subdistrict situated on the northwestern part of Shijingshan District, Beijing, China. It shares border with Junzhuang Town and Xiangshan Subdistrict to the north, Pingguoyuan Subdistrict and Sijiqing Township to the east, Jinding Street and Guangning Subdistricts to the south, as well as Chengzi Subdistrict and Longquan Township to the west. Its population was 41,248 as of 2020.

The subdistrict was first instituted in 1963, and was name after Wulituo village that used to exist within its border.

Administrative Divisions 
In 2021, Wulituo Subdistrict covered 15 communities within its borders, all of which are listed as follows:

See also 
 List of township-level divisions of Beijing

References 

Shijingshan District
Subdistricts of Beijing